Harold George Meritt (22 September 1920 – March 2004) was an English semi-professional footballer who made one appearance in the Football League for Leyton Orient.

Personal life 
Meritt served in the British Army during the Second World War.

Career statistics

References 

English Football League players
English footballers
Association football inside forwards
1920 births
2004 deaths
People from Ormskirk
Leyton Orient F.C. players
Everton F.C. players
Margate F.C. players
Yeovil Town F.C. players
Southern Football League players
Trowbridge Town F.C. players
Dorchester Town F.C. players
Poole Town F.C. players
British Army personnel of World War II
Kent Football League (1894–1959) players